Alexander Toth (June 25, 1928 – May 27, 2006) was an American cartoonist active from the 1940s through the 1980s. Toth's work began in the American comic book industry, but he is also known for his animation designs for Hanna-Barbera throughout the 1960s and 1970s. His work included Super Friends, Fantastic Four, Space Ghost, Sealab 2020, The Herculoids and Birdman. Toth's work has been resurrected in the late-night, adult-themed spin-offs on Cartoon Network’s late night sister channel Adult Swim: Space Ghost Coast to Coast, Sealab 2021 and Harvey Birdman, Attorney at Law.

He was inducted into the comic book industry's Jack Kirby Hall of Fame in 1990.

Biography

Early life and career
Alex Toth was born in 1928 to immigrants from Hungary, who were part of the Slovak minority in Hungary. His father was Sandor Toth, a musician, and his mother was Mary Elizabeth. Toth's talent was noticed early, and a teacher from his poster class in junior high school urged him to devote himself to art. Enrolling in the School of Industrial Art, Toth studied illustration. He began his career when he sold his first freelance art at the age of 15, subsequently illustrating true stories for Heroic magazine through a comic book packager named Steve Douglas. Although he initially aimed to do newspaper strips ("It was my dream to do what Caniff, Raymond, and Foster had done"), he found the industry "dying" and instead moved into comic books.

After graduating from the School of Industrial Art in 1947, Toth was hired by Sheldon Mayer at National/DC Comics. Green Lantern #28 (Oct.–Nov. 1947) was one of the first comics he drew for the company. He drew four issues of All Star Comics including issues #38 and #41 in which the Black Canary first met the Justice Society of America and then joined the team. A canine sidekick for Green Lantern named Streak was introduced in Green Lantern #30 (Feb.–March 1948) and the dog proved so popular that he became the featured character on several covers of the series starting with #34. He worked at DC for five years, drawing the Golden Age versions of the Flash, Doctor Mid-Nite, and the Atom. In addition to superheroes, Toth drew Western comics for DC including All-Star Western. He was assigned to the "Johnny Thunder" feature in All-Star Western because editor Julius Schwartz considered him to be "my best artist at the time." Toth and writer Robert Kanigher co-created Rex the Wonder Dog in 1952.

For a brief time in 1950, Toth was able to realize his dream of working on newspaper comic strips by ghost illustrating Casey Ruggles with Warren Tufts. In 1952 Toth ended his contract with DC Comics and moved to California. It is during that time that he worked on crime, war and romance comics for Standard Comics. In 1954, Toth was drafted into the U.S. Army and stationed in Tokyo, Japan. While in Japan, he wrote and drew his own weekly adventure strip, Jon Fury, for the base paper, Depot Diary. He served in the Army until 1956.

Animation and later career

Returning to the United States in 1956, Toth settled in the Los Angeles area and worked primarily for Dell Comics until 1960. In that year, Toth became art director for the Space Angel animated science fiction show. This led to his being hired by Hanna-Barbera, where he created the character Space Ghost for the animated series of the same name. His other creations include The Herculoids, Birdman and the Galaxy Trio, and Dino Boy in the Lost Valley. He worked as a storyboard and design artist until 1968 and then again in 1973 when he was assigned to Australia for five months to produce the TV series Super Friends.

He continued to work in comic books, contributing to Warren Publishing's magazines Eerie, Creepy and The Rook. For DC Comics, he drew the first issue of The Witching Hour (February–March 1969) and introduced the series' three witches. Toth illustrated the comic book tie-in to the Hot Wheels animated series based on the toy line. His collaboration with writer Bob Haney on the four page story "Dirty Job" in Our Army at War #241 (Feb. 1972), has been described as a "true masterpiece". Toth worked with writer/editor Archie Goodwin on the story "Burma Sky" in Our Fighting Forces #146 (Dec. 1973–Jan. 1974) and Goodwin praised Toth's art in a 1998 interview: "To me, having Alex Toth do any kind of airplane story, it's a joy for me. If I see a chance to do something like that, I will. He did a really fabulous job on it." The two men crafted a Batman story for Detective Comics #442 (Aug.-Sept. 1974) as well. Toth and E. Nelson Bridwell produced a framing sequence for the Super Friends feature in Limited Collectors' Edition #C-41 (Dec 1975–Jan. 1976). Toth's final work for DC was the cover for Batman Black and White #4 (Sept. 1996).

Death
Toth died at his drawing table on May 27, 2006, four weeks shy of his 78th birthday.

Personal life
Alex Toth was the father of four children, sons Eric and Damon and daughters Dana and Carrie. His marriage to Christina Schraber Hyde ended in divorce in 1968, and his second wife, Guyla Avery, died in 1985.

Legacy
Toth did much of his comics work outside superhero comics, concentrating instead on such subjects as hot rod racing, romance, horror, and action-adventure. His work on Disney's Zorro has been reprinted in trade paperback form several times. Also, there are two volumes of The Alex Toth Reader, published by Pure Imagination, which focuses on his work for Standard Comics and Western Publishing. Brian Bolland has cited Toth as one of his idols.

Journalist Tom Spurgeon wrote that Toth possessed "an almost transcendent understanding of the power of art as a visual story component", and called him "one of the handful of people who could seriously enter into Greatest Comic Book Artist of All-Time discussions" and "a giant of 20th-century cartoon design".

Toth was known for his exhaustive study of other artists and his outspoken analysis of comics art past and present. For example, in a 2001 interview he criticized the trend of fully painted comics, saying "It could be comics if those who know how to paint also knew how to tell a story! Who knew what pacing was, and didn't just jam a lot of pretty pictures together into a page, pages, and call it a story, continuity! It ain't!" Toth lamented what he saw as a lack of awareness on the part of younger artists of their predecessors, as well as a feeling that the innocent fun of comics' past was being lost in the pursuit of pointless nihilism and mature content.

In the 1990s and 2000s, he contributed to the magazines Comic Book Artist and Alter Ego, writing the columns "Before I Forget" and "Who Cares? I Do!", respectively. In 2006, James Counts and Billy Ingram compiled personal anecdotes, hundreds of unseen sketches from famous Alex Toth comic and animated works combined with correspondence with friend and comics dealer John Hitchcock in the book Dear John: The Alex Toth Doodle Book (Octopus Press). Launched at ComicCon 2006, the first printing sold out within weeks of first publication.

Film director Michael Almereyda said Toth was a formative influence on his youth, and credits Toth's long interest in Nikola Tesla as the catalyst for Almereyda's biographical drama Tesla:

Awards and recognition
 Inkpot Award from the San Diego Comic Con, 1981
 Inducted into the comic book industry's Jack Kirby Hall of Fame in 1990.

Bibliography

DC Comics

 Adventure Comics #418–419 (Black Canary); #425, 431, 495–497 (1972–1983) 
 Adventures of Rex the Wonder Dog #1–3 (1952) 
 All-American Comics #88 (Doctor Mid-Nite); #92, 96, 98–99 (Green Lantern); #100–102 (Johnny Thunder) (1947–1948) 
 All-American Western #103–125 (Johnny Thunder) (1948–1952) 
 All Star Comics #37–38, 40–41 (Justice Society of America) (1947–1948) 
 All-Star Western #58–61, 63 (1951–1952) 
 Blackhawk #260 (1983) 
 The Brave and the Bold #53 (the Atom and the Flash team-up) (1964) 
 Comic Cavalcade #26–28 (Green Lantern) (1948) 
 Dale Evans Comics #1–13 (1948–1950) 
 Danger Trail #1–5 (1950–1951) 
 DC Comics Presents #84 (Superman and the Challengers of the Unknown team-up) (1985) 
 Detective Comics #174 (Roy Raymond); #442 (Batman) (1951–1974) 
 Flash Comics #102 (1948) 
 Girls' Love Stories #1–2, 4 (1949–1950) 
 Girls' Romances #2, 13, 120 (1950–1966) 
 Green Lantern #28, 30–31, 34–38 (1947–1949) 
 Green Lantern vol. 2 #171 (1983) 
 Hot Wheels #1–5 (1970) 
 House of Mystery #109, 120, 149, 182, 184, 187, 190, 194 (1961–1971) 
 House of Secrets #48, 63–67, 83, 123 (1961–1974) 
 Jimmy Wakely #1–15 (1949–1952) 
 Limited Collectors' Edition #C-41 (Super Friends) (1975) 
 My Greatest Adventure #58, 60–61, 77, 81, 85 (1961–1964) 
 Mystery in Space #1, 7 (1951–1952) 
 Our Army at War #235, 241, 254 (1971–1973) 
 Our Fighting Forces #134, 146 (1971–1973) 
 Plop! #11 (1975) 
 Rip Hunter... Time Master #6–7 (1962) 
 Romance Trail #1–4, 6 (1949–1950) 
 Secret Hearts #114, 141–143, 149 (1966–1971) 
 Sensation Comics #91–92, 107 (1949–1952) 
 Sensation Mystery #114 (1953) 
 Sinister House of Secret Love #3 (1972) 
 Star Spangled War Stories #164 (1972) 
 Strange Adventures #8–9, 12–13, 17–19 (1951–1952) 
 Superman Annual #9 (1983) 
 Weird War Tales #5, 6, 10 (1972-1973) 
 Weird Western Tales #14 (1972) 
 The Witching Hour #1, 3, 8, 10–12 (1969–1970) 
 World's Finest Comics #54, 66 (1951–1953) 
 Young Love #74, 78–79 (1969–1970) 
 Young Romance #163–164 (1969–1970)

Dell Comics

 Colt .45 #6 (1960)  
 The Flying A's Range Rider #17 (1957)  
 Four Color #790, 822, 845–846, 877, 882, 889, 907, 920, 914, 933, 951, 960, 976, 992, 1003, 1018, 1014, 1024, 1041, 1069, 1066, 1071, 1085, 1105–1106, 1134, 1159, 1180, 1265 (1957–1962)  
 The Frogmen #5 (1963)  
 Hugh O'Brian, Famous Marshal Wyatt Earp #10, 13 (1960–1961)  
 Jace Pearson's Tales of the Texas Rangers #15–16 (1957)   
 Lawman #4 (1960)
 Maverick #10, 13 (1960)  
 Rex Allen #24 (1957)  
 The Rifleman #3, 6 (1960–1961)  
 Rin Tin Tin and Rusty #34, 36 (1960–1961)  
 Roy Rogers and Trigger #111, 119–124 (1957–1958)  
 Voyage to the Deep #3 (1963)  
 Wagon Train #5 (1960)  
 Western Roundup #18 (1957)  
 Zorro #9, 12 (1960–1961)

Gold Key Comics
 Boris Karloff Tales of Mystery #5 (1963)
 Darby O'Gill and the Little People #1 (1970)
 Mystery Comics Digest #3, 5, 12, 21 (1972–1975) 
 Twilight Zone #3–4, 25 (1963–1968)
 Walt Disney Comics Digest #9, 35, 39, 52 (1969–1975)
 Walt Disney Presents Zorro #1–2, 4–5, 7–9 (1966–1968)
 Walt Disney Showcase #34 (1976)

Marvel Comics
 Justice #41 (1953) 
 Love Romances #49, 53 (1955) 
 Lovers #67 (1955) 
 My Love Story #7 (1957) 
 My Own Romance #55 (1957) 
 Rawhide Kid #46 (1965) 
 TV Stars #3 (Space Ghost) (1978) 
 Western Gunfighters #24 (1957) 
 X-Men #12 (1965)

Standard Comics

 Adventures into Darkness #5, 8–9 (1952–1953)  
 Battlefront #5 (1952)  
 Best Romance #5 (1952)  
 Crime Files #5 (1952)  
 Exciting War #8 (1953)  
 Fantastic Worlds #5–6 (1952)  
 Intimate Love #19, 21–22, 26 (1952–1954)  
 Jet Fighters #5, 7 (1952–1953)  
 Joe Yank #5–6, 8, 10, 15 (1952–1954)  
 Lost Worlds #5–6 (1952)  
 My Real Love #5 (1952)  
 New Romances #10–11, 14, 16–20 (1952–1954)  
 Out of the Shadows #5–6, 10–12 (1952–1954)  
 Popular Romance #22–27 (1953–1954)   
 This Is War #5–6, 9 (1952–1953)  
 Thrilling Romances #19, 22–24 (1952–1954)  
 Today's Romance #6 (1952)  
 The Unseen #5–6, 12–13 (1952–1954)

Warren Publishing
 Blazing Combat #1–4 (1965–1966)
 Creepy #5, 7, 23, 75–80, 91, 114, 122–125, 139, Annual #1 (1965–1982)
 Eerie #2–3, 14, 16, 51, 64–65, 67, Annual #1 (1966–1975)  
 The Rook Magazine #3–4 (1980)
 U.F.O. and Alien Comix #1 (1977)
 Vampirella #90, 108, 110 (1980–1982)
 Warren Presents #3 (1979)

References

Further reading
 Alex Toth edited by Manuel Auad, Kitchen Sink Press, 1995, 
 Toth: One for the Road edited by Manuel Auad, Auad, 2000, 
 The Toth Reader Pure Imagination, 1995, 
 The Alex Toth Reader vol. 2 Pure Imagination, 2005, 
 Dear John: The Alex Toth Doodle Book by Alex Toth and John Hitchcock, Octopus Press, 2006,  
 Alex Toth: Edge of Genius Volume 1 Pure Imagination, 2007, 
 Alex Toth: Edge of Genius Volume 2 Pure Imagination, 2008
 Alex Toth in Hollywood Volume 1 Pure Imagination, 2009, 
 Alex Toth in Hollywood Volume 2 Pure Imagination, 2010, 
 Setting the Standard: Comics by Alex Toth 1952–1954 Fantagraphics Books, 2011, 
 Genius, Isolated: The Life and Art of Alex Toth by Dean Mullaney & Bruce Canwell, IDW, 2011, 
 Genius, Illustrated: The Life and Art of Alex Toth by Dean Mullaney & Bruce Canwell, IDW, 2013, 
 Genius, Animated: The Cartoon Art of Alex Toth by Dean Mullaney & Bruce Canwell, IDW, 2014,

External links

 Official Alex Toth website
 

 Alex Toth at Mike's Amazing World of Comics
 Alex Toth at the Unofficial Handbook of Marvel Comics Creators

1928 births
2006 deaths
20th-century American artists
20th-century American writers
21st-century American writers
American animators
American comics artists
American comic strip cartoonists
American magazine writers
American storyboard artists
Artists from New York City
Disney comics artists
EC Comics
Eisner Award winners
Golden Age comics creators
Hanna-Barbera people
High School of Art and Design alumni
Inkpot Award winners
Silver Age comics creators
United States Army soldiers
Will Eisner Award Hall of Fame inductees